"Bang Bang You're Dead" is a song by English band Dirty Pretty Things. It was released as the first single from the band's debut album, Waterloo to Anywhere (2006), on 24 April 2006. The song charted at number five on the UK Singles Chart and topped the NME chart in 2006. The same year, it was used as the theme tune to the BBC series Sorted.

Early rumours about the song claimed it was about Pete Doherty, citing the lyrics; 'I gave you the midas touch, you turned round and scratched out my heart' as evidence. Carl Barât later affirmed this in an interview for Vulture.

Track listings
UK maxi-CD single
 "Bang Bang You're Dead"
 "Gin & Milk" (acoustic version)
 "If You Were Wondering" (Tavern version)

UK limited-edition 7-inch single
A. "Bang Bang You're Dead"
B. "If You Were Wondering" (acoustic version)

UK DVD single
 "Bang Bang You're Dead" (video)
 "Bang Bang Diaries" (documentary)
 "Bang Bang You're Dead Demo" (Paris clip)
 "Bang Bang You're Dead" (gallery)

Charts

Weekly charts

Year-end charts

Certifications

References

2006 singles
2006 songs
Dirty Pretty Things (band) songs
Song recordings produced by Dave Sardy
Songs written by Anthony Rossomando
Songs written by Carl Barât
Vertigo Records singles